Dorothea Herbert (c.1767–1829) was an Irish diarist and poet. Her Retrospections, (original title: Retrospections of an Outcast, or the Reflections of Dorothea Herbert written in Retirement) first published in two volumes in 1929-30, contains an account of life in late eighteenth century Carrick-on-Suir, County Tipperary, Ireland, where her father was rector, but her witty observations and social insights were soon overshadowed by her unrequited passion for John Roe, heir to Rockwell near Knockgrafton, another of her father's parishes. Retrospections provides historians with a valuable insight into eighteenth-century life in provincial Ireland.

Life
Herbert was the eldest (of nine children) of Rev. Nicholas Herbert, Church of Ireland rector of Carrick-on-Suir, County Tipperary. Her mother, Martha, was the daughter of John Cuffe, Lord Desart. Her education was as a day-pupil at a boarding-school in Carrick. Private tutors  were engaged to teach her dancing, French and music. 

Initially, Dorothea enjoyed the genteel social life of the town (although privately she regarded its manners as "amusingly vulgar and uncivilised").  She rejected an offer of marriage from her father's curate, John Gwynne (despite the fact that that she found him goodnatured and amusing) at her mother's insistence.  

While residing in Carrick, Rev. Herbert benefited from  the livings of three other parishes, with curates undertaking the church duties at each. In 1788, however, the diocese directed him to spend more attention to Knockgrafton, a parish some twenty miles from Carrick. Rev. Herbert built a house there and visited annually. There, Dorothea encountered John Roe, the "mysterious, moody and attractive" son of a local landowner. She became infatuated with Roe but this was not requited: over six annual visits she came to understand that, at best, Roe accepted her as no more than a harmless dalliance. 

The "betrayal" (as Dorothea believed) by Roe caused her to withdraw from society and she fell into a solitary existence. She was barred from attending church because of her "profane conduct". By 1798, when (as Herbert relates it) her "foster-mother" was murdered by rebels in the "Whiteboys" anti-landlord uprising, she had already suffered a nervous breakdown. This outrage was followed first by the death of her brother, Otway, and then that of her father.

The Herberts continued to live in Carrick following the death of Rev. Nicholas Herbert, but thereafter Dorothea's life diminished into that of a "melancholic, hysterical spinster".

Works
In spite of increasing isolation, depression and derangement Dorothea wrote plays, novels and an opera, none of which can be accounted for. However her Poetical Eccentricities Written by an Oddity, a volume of poetry, has survived. It, along with her Journal Notes (a continuation of her Retrospections), has been published as a biography by historian Dr. Frances Finnegan.

Notes

References

Further reading
 Retrospections of Dorothea Herbert 1770-1806, First published 1929-30 by Gerard Howe, London; Published in Hardback by TownHouse 1988 and published in Paperback by TownHouse, Dublin 2004 

1767 births
1829 deaths
Irish diarists
Irish women poets
English-language poets
People from County Tipperary
Women diarists